Yveta Synek Graff (November 18, 1933, Prague, Czechoslovakia — November 6, 2015, Montecito, California)  was a vocal and language coach and writer who helped popularize the performances of Czech operas internationally during the last quarter of the 20th century and early 21st century. Considered one of the world's leading authorities on Czech operas, she was described by The New York Times as the "secret weapon of Czech opera’s velvet revolution". She was widely admired for her translations of Czech operas into English which were utilized in performances by companies like the Metropolitan Opera and the Lyric Opera of Chicago. She also coached artists for performances in Czech; including working on productions for the Glyndebourne Festival Opera, the Los Angeles Opera, the New York City Opera, the San Francisco Opera, and The Royal Opera in London among others.

References

1933 births
2015 deaths
Czech opera singers
Czech women writers
Vocal coaches